Mila Savić (born 24 April 1974) is a Serbian sprinter. She competed in the women's 200 metres at the 2000 Summer Olympics.

References

1974 births
Living people
Athletes (track and field) at the 2000 Summer Olympics
Serbian female sprinters
Olympic athletes of Yugoslavia
Place of birth missing (living people)
Olympic female sprinters